Fred Finn (born 1919, Killavil, County Sligo – died January, 1986) was a popular musician in South Sligo, in western Ireland, known for his wit and humour as well as his fiddle playing. His father Mick, a Fianna Fáil activist and former councillor, was also a fiddle player. 

Fred played with many musicians from the locality, and for 30 years performed as a duo with Peter Horan.

Footnotes

Discography
 Music of Sligo (with Peter Horan)

External links 
Comhaltas Ceoltoiri Eireann page

1986 deaths
1919 births
Irish folk musicians
Musicians from County Sligo